Lisbon Story  is a 1994 feature film directed by Wim Wenders. It was screened in the Un Certain Regard section at the 1995 Cannes Film Festival. As part of Lisbon's programme as the European City of Culture in 1994, Wenders and three Portuguese filmmakers were invited to make a documentary about the city. The result was the fictional Lisbon Story.

Plot

Lisbon Story is partially a sequel to Wenders' 1982 film, The State of Things. The fictitious movie director in the previous film, Friedrich Munro, reappears, again played by Patrick Bauchau.

In Lisbon Story Friedrich has moved to Lisbon, Portugal (the country where The State of Things was set). The principal character, Philip Winter (Rüdiger Vogler), a sound engineer, receives a postcard invitation from Friedrich to come to Lisbon to record sounds of the capital city for his forthcoming film. On arriving at the house where he is staying, it finds it occupied with his film editing equipment, but the director is nowhere to be found. Some children who apparently work with him indicate he will return, but don't know when. This sets in motion Winter's quest to find the missing Friedrich.

The sound engineer doesn't meet up with the director until the end of the movie, when it materialises that, disturbed by the commercialization of images, he had set out to capture what he terms the "unseen image" of the city, one devoid of the subjective view (executed by strapping a rolling camera onto his back, or carried about unaimed in plastic bags with holes cut for the lens), and then shown to no one, lest the source of the photo "die" with their viewing. This is after giving up on a silent movie project using an early motion picture camera, what he calls "pretending that the whole history of cinema had never happened." After they part Winter leaves his own message for Friedrich using sound, his medium, and convinces him to continue his original project using the old-fashioned camera and his sound, together.

A semi-non-fictional aspect of the plot is the appearance of the internationally famous Portuguese folk music group Madredeus and Manoel de Oliveira.

Homage to The Road Movie Trilogy
During the mid-1970s, Wim Wenders made three films which critics have called The Road Movie Trilogy. Lisbon Story pays subtle homage to these films. The sound engineer in Lisbon Story, Philip Winter, has the same name and is played by the same actor (Rüdiger Vogler) as the lead character in Alice in the Cities (1974), though the character Phil Winter was a writer in the first film. The name Winter is repeated in Kings of the Road (1976), also starring Vogler, although his full name in Kings is Bruno Winter and he is a projection-equipment mechanic.

Featured cast

Reception
In Portugal, the film was the fourth most popular Portuguese film in 1995 with admissions of 16,000.

References

External links

 Official Website
Lisbon Story at AllMovie
Lisbon Story at Rotten Tomatoes
 Deep Focus Review

1994 films
1990s musical drama films
German drama road movies
1990s German-language films
1990s English-language films
English-language German films
1990s Portuguese-language films
1990s drama road movies
Films about filmmaking
Films directed by Wim Wenders
Films produced by Paulo Branco
Films set in Lisbon
Films scored by Jürgen Knieper
1994 drama films
Films shot in Portugal
1990s German films